Demur Tapladze (born 18 March 2000) is a Georgian rugby union player. He plays as Wing for Lelo Saracens in Georgia Championship Didi 10.
He was called in Georgia U20 squad for 2018 World Rugby Under 20 Championship.

References

2000 births
Living people
Rugby union players from Georgia (country)
Lelo Saracens players
The Black Lion players
Rugby union centres
Rugby union wings